Soi (Sohi) is one of the Central Iranian language varieties of Iran, one of five listed in Ethnologue that together have 35,000 speakers. It is closely related to Natanzi.

References

Western Iranian languages